Stražisko is a municipality and village in Prostějov District in the Olomouc Region of the Czech Republic. It has about 400 inhabitants.

Administrative parts
Villages of Maleny and Růžov are administrative parts of Stražisko.

Notable people
Otto Wichterle (1913–1998), chemist, inventor of contact lens; lived and died here
Jan Hrbatý (1942–2019), ice hockey player

References

Villages in Prostějov District